Carbon dioxide removal (CDR), also known as negative  emissions, is a process in which carbon dioxide gas is removed from the atmosphere and durably stored (or sequestered) in geological, terrestrial, or ocean reservoirs, or in products. Similarly, greenhouse gas removal (GGR) or negative greenhouse gas emissions is the removal of greenhouse gases (GHGs) from the atmosphere by deliberate human activities, i.e., in addition to the removal that would occur via natural carbon cycle or atmospheric chemistry processes. In the context of net zero greenhouse gas emissions targets, CDR is increasingly integrated into climate policy, as a new element of mitigation strategies. CDR and GGR methods are also known as negative emissions technologies (NET), and may be cheaper than preventing some agricultural greenhouse gas emissions.

CDR methods includes carbon sequestration methods (for example afforestation, agricultural practices that sequester carbon in soils (carbon farming), enhanced weathering, etc.) and direct air capture when combined with storage. To assess whether net negative emissions are achieved by a particular process, comprehensive life cycle analysis of the process must be performed.

There is potential to remove and sequester up to 10 gigatons of carbon dioxide per year by using those existing CDR methods which can be safely and economically deployed now. This would offset greenhouse gas emissions at about a fifth of the rate at which they are being produced (as of 2018).

All emission pathways that limit global warming to 1.5 °C or 2 °C by the year 2100 assume the use of CDR approaches in combination with emission reductions.

Definitions

Carbon dioxide removal (CDR) is defined as:

The same definition is commonly used for "net negative greenhouse gas emissions", "net zero  emissions" and "net zero greenhouse gas emissions".

The terminology in this area is still evolving. The term geoengineering (or climate engineering) is sometimes used in the scientific literature for both CDR or SRM (solar radiation management), if the techniques are used at a global scale. The terms geoengineering or climate engineering are no longer used in IPCC reports.

When CDR is framed as a form of "climate engineering", people tend to view it as intrinsically risky. In fact, CDR addresses the root cause of climate change and is part of strategies to reduce net emissions and manage risks related to elevated atmospheric CO2 levels.

Categories 
CDR methods can be placed in different categories that are based on different criteria:

 Role in the carbon cycle (land-based biological; ocean-based biological; geochemical; chemical); or
 Timescale of storage (decades to centuries; centuries to millennia; thousand years or longer)

Concepts using similar terminology
CDR can be confused with carbon capture and storage (CCS), a process in which carbon dioxide is collected from point-sources such as gas-fired power plants, whose smokestacks emit  in a concentrated stream. The  is then compressed and sequestered or utilized. When used to sequester the carbon from a gas-fired power plant, CCS reduces emissions from continued use of the point source, but does not reduce the amount of carbon dioxide already in the atmosphere.

Potential for climate change mitigation 

The likely need for CDR (carbon dioxide removal) as an element of climate change mitigation has been publicly expressed by a range of individuals and organizations involved with climate change issues, including IPCC chief Dr. Hoesung Lee, the UNFCCC executive secretary Christiana Figueres, and the World Watch Institute. Institutions with major programs focusing on CDR include the Lenfest Center for Sustainable Energy at the Earth Institute, Columbia University, and the Climate Decision Making Center, an international collaboration operated out of Carnegie-Mellon University's Department of Engineering and Public Policy.

Using CDR in parallel with other efforts to reduce greenhouse gas emissions, such as deploying renewable energy, is likely to be less expensive and disruptive than using other efforts alone. This is one-fifth of the 50 gigatons of  emitted per year by human activities. In 2018, all analyzed mitigation pathways that would prevent more than 1.5 °C of warming included CDR measures.

Some mitigation pathways propose achieving higher rates of CDR through massive deployment of one technology, however these pathways assume that hundreds of millions of hectares of cropland are converted to growing biofuel crops. Further research in the areas of direct air capture, geologic sequestration of carbon dioxide, and carbon mineralization could potentially yield technological advancements that make higher rates of CDR economically feasible.

Reliance on large-scale deployment of CDR was regarded in 2018 as a "major risk" to achieving the goal of less than 1.5 °C of warming, given the uncertainties in how quickly CDR can be deployed at scale. Strategies for mitigating climate change that rely less on CDR and more on sustainable use of energy carry less of this risk. The possibility of large-scale future CDR deployment has been described as a moral hazard, as it could lead to a reduction in near-term efforts to mitigate climate change. The 2019 NASEM report concludes:

Methods

Overview listing based on technology readiness level 
The following is a list of known CDR methods in the order of their technology readiness level. The ones at the top have a high TDR of 8 to 9 (9 being the maximum possible value, meaning the technology is proven), the ones at the bottom have a low TDR of 1 to 2, meaning the technology is not proven or only validated at laboratory scale.

 Afforestation/ reforestation
 Soil carbon sequestration in croplands and grasslands
 Peatland and coastal wetland restoration
 Agroforestry, improved forest management
 Biochar
 Direct air carbon capture and storage (DACCS), bioenergy with carbon capture and storage (BECCS)
 Enhanced weathering (EW)
 ‘Blue carbon management’ in coastal wetlands (restoration of vegetated coastal ecosystems; an ocean-based biological CDR method which encompasses mangroves, salt marshes and seagrass beds)
 Ocean fertilisation, ocean alkalinity enhancement 
The CDR methods with the greatest potential to contribute to climate change mitigation efforts as per illustrative mitigation pathways are the land-based biological CDR methods (primarily afforestation/reforestation (A/R)) and/or bioenergy with carbon capture  and storage (BECCS). Some of the pathways also include direct air capture and storage (DACCS). The land-based biological CDR methods can reduce emissions from the sector called "agriculture, forestry and other land use" (AFOLU).

Afforestation, reforestation, and forestry management 

According to the International Union for Conservation of Nature: "Halting the loss and degradation of natural systems and promoting their restoration have the potential to contribute over one-third of the total climate change mitigation scientists say is required by 2030."

Forests are vital for human society, animals and plant species. This is because trees keep air clean, regulate the local climate and provide a habitat for numerous species. Trees and plants convert carbon dioxide back into oxygen, using photosynthesis. They are important for regulating  levels in the air, as they remove and store carbon from the air. Without them, the atmosphere would heat up quickly and destabilise the climate.

Increased use of wood in construction is being considered.

Carbon sequestration on land and in the ocean

Agricultural practices

Biochar 

Biochar is created by the pyrolysis of biomass, and is under investigation as a method of carbon sequestration.
Biochar is a charcoal that is used for agricultural purposes which also aids in carbon sequestration, the capture or hold of carbon.  It is created using a process called pyrolysis, which is basically the act of high temperature heating biomass in an environment with low oxygen levels.  What remains is a material known as char, similar to charcoal but is made through a sustainable process, thus the use of biomass.  Biomass is organic matter produced by living organisms or recently living organisms, most commonly plants or plant based material. A study done by the UK Biochar Research Center has stated that, on a conservative level, biochar can store 1 gigaton of carbon per year.  With greater effort in marketing and acceptance of biochar, the benefit could be the storage of 5–9 gigatons per year of carbon in biochar soils.

Direct air capture with carbon sequestration

Others

Magnesium silicate/oxide in cement 
The replacement of carbonate in cement allows for the potential absorption of carbon dioxide over concrete lifecycle. However, lifecycle amounts are not yet fully understood.

Issues

Economic issues

The cost of CDR differs substantially depending on the maturity of the technology employed as well as the economics of both voluntary carbon removal markets and the physical output; for example, the pyrolysis of biomass produces biochar that has various commercial applications, including soil regeneration and wastewater treatment. In 2021 DAC cost from $250 to $600 per ton, compared to $100 for biochar and less than $50 for nature-based solutions, such as reforestation and afforestation. The fact that biochar commands a higher price in the carbon removal market than nature-based solutions reflects the fact that it is a more durable sink with carbon being sequestered for hundreds or even thousands of years while nature-based solutions represent a more volatile form of storage, which risks related to forest fires, pests, economic pressures and changing political priorities. The Oxford Principles for Net Zero Aligned Carbon Offsetting states that to be compatible with the Paris Agreement: "...organizations must commit to gradually increase the percentage of carbon removal offsets they procure with the view of exclusively sourcing carbon removals by mid-century." These initiatives along with the development of new industry standards for engineered carbon removal, such as the Puro Standard, will help to support the growth of the carbon removal market.

Forests can be used to create carbon credits, often involving the use of geospatial analytical systems to calculate carbon offsets by conserving a forest area or a reforestation initiative. REDD+ is an example of a carbon credit initiative. Individuals and businesses can purchase carbon credits through verified retailers such as ACT4.

In 2021, businessman Elon Musk announced he was donating $100m for a prize for best carbon capture technology.

Although CDR is not covered by the EU Allowance as of 2021, the European Commission is preparing for carbon removal certification and considering carbon contracts for difference. CDR might also in future be added to the UK Emissions Trading Scheme. As of end 2021 carbon prices for both these cap-and-trade schemes currently based on carbon reductions, as opposed to carbon removals, remained below $100.

In April 2022, a private sector alliance led by Stripe with prominent members including Meta, Google and Shopify, revealed a nearly $1 billion fund to reward companies able to permanently capture & store carbon.  According to senior Stripe employee Nan Ransohoff, the new fund "is roughly 30 times the carbon-removal market that existed in 2021. But it’s still 1,000 times short of the market we need by 2050."

According to the National Academies of Sciences, Engineering and Medicine, some of these "negative-emission technologies" are already being used on a large scale. Congress passed the 45Q tax, which gives companies a $50 credit for every ton of carbon dioxide they fix and store. So the study proposes some  fixation technologies that cost between $20 and $100 per ton.

Removal of other greenhouse gases

Although some researchers have suggested methods for removing methane, others say that nitrous oxide would be a better subject for research due to its longer lifetime in the atmosphere.

See also

 Carbon dioxide scrubber
 Carbon-neutral fuel
 Climate change scenario
 Climate engineering
 List of emerging technologies
 Lithium peroxide
 Low-carbon economy
 Virgin Earth Challenge

References

Sources

External links

Deep Dives by Carbon180. Info about carbon removal solutions.

The Road to Ten Gigatons - Carbon Removal Scale Up Challenge Game.

Climate engineering
Climate change policy